Sabine Schoene, (born January 27, 1974 in Munich) is a former professional squash player who represented Germany. She reached a career-high world ranking of World No. 6 in November 1997.

Career 
As a junior, Sabine Schoene won ten national junior titles in various age groups. 1988, at the age of only 14 she won her first National Championship title in the women's division - a title she held for 17 years until she retired in 2004. 
In 1991 she lost the final of the World Junior Championships against Cassie Campion. 
For eight years she was ranked inside the Top Ten with five tournament wins and a silver medal at the World Games in Lahti in 1997.
2010 and 2012 she became World Champion in the O35 category.

References

External links 
 
 
 

1972 births
Living people
German female squash players
World Games silver medalists
Competitors at the 1997 World Games